The Con is a 1998 television movie starring William H. Macy and Rebecca De Mornay. De Mornay plays a con woman who develops romantic feelings for her mark (Macy) while scheming to marry him in order to get her hands on his fortune. It was directed by Steven Schachter and written by Macy and Schachter, who shared the 1999 Lone Star Film & Television Award for Best TV Teleplay. The film originally aired on the USA Network.

References

External links

1998 television films
1998 films
Films directed by Steven Schachter
Films shot in Houston
USA Network original films